The Dig is a 2018 Irish drama film directed by Andy Tohill and Ryan Tohill, from a screenplay by Stuart Drennan. The film was screened at the Toronto International Film Festival and was produced by Brian J Falconer for northern Irish firm Out of Orbit.

Plot
A father (Lorcan Cranitch as Sean McKenna) becomes obsessed with finding the body of his murdered daughter Naimh. The murderer Ronan Callahan (Moe Dunford) is released from jail after serving a 15-year sentence. At first he wants Sean off his land, but decides to help dig for Naimh's missing body in the bog. He pours the old alcohol in his house down the drain but eventually drinks shots in a pub, hoping to remember the act of murder and where he buried the girl. He develops a relationship with the victim's sister Roberta (Emily Taaffe), and it is revealed that his father had abused his mother, who died when he was 14. Ronan and Sean vow to not stop digging. Ronan eventually remembers a detail that proves he is not the murderer.

Reception

Critical response 
On Rotten Tomatoes the film holds an approval rating of 75% based on 12 reviews, with an average rating of 6.7/10.

Accolades

Cast
 Moe Dunford as Ronan Callahan
 Francis Magee as Murphy
 Emily Taaffe as Roberta McKenna
 Lorcan Cranitch as Sean McKenna
 Katherine Devlin as Siobhan

References

External links
 
 

2018 films
British thriller films
Irish thriller films
2010s English-language films
English-language Irish films
2010s British films